David H. Blevins (born July 23, 1949, in Powell, Wyoming) is an American politician and a Republican member of the Wyoming House of Representatives representing District 25 since January 8, 2013.

Education
Blevins earned his BS from the University of Wyoming.

Elections
2012 When Republican Representative Dave Bonner retired and left the District 25 seat open, Blevins won the four-way August 21, 2012 Republican Primary with 765 votes (44.3%), and was unopposed for the November 6, 2012 General election, winning with 3,456 votes.

References

External links
Official page at the Wyoming Legislature
 

1949 births
Living people
Republican Party members of the Wyoming House of Representatives
People from Powell, Wyoming
United States Navy officers
University of Wyoming alumni